Liangqing was a Chinese Buddhist monk and abbot of Famen Temple.

At the beginning of the Chinese Cultural Revolution in 1966, a campaign was introduced to destroy the Four Olds. As Buddhist sites and temples were widely targeted during this campaign, Liangqing's Famen Temple was a major target for destruction. Hundreds of Red Guards were sent to destroy the Famen Temple. Due to this imposing threat, Liangqing, the temple's Abbot, chose an act of self-immolation to protect the temple and contents from destruction. Although the contents of the temple were all smashed by the Red Guard, Liangqing's self-sacrifice was successful as the temple's True Relic Pagoda and its relic of the Buddha were both saved from destruction.

References 

1896 births
1966 suicides
Suicides by self-immolation
Buddhist abbots
People's Republic of China Buddhist monks
Suicides during the Cultural Revolution
1966 in China
Self-immolations by Buddhists
People from Yanshi
Date of birth missing
Qing dynasty Buddhist monks
Republic of China Buddhist monks
Buddhist martyrs
Rinzai Buddhists
20th-century Buddhist monks